Critical Gameplay is a video game developer, founded in 2009 by game developer Lindsay Grace.

List of games
Each of the following games was developed under rapid prototyping constraints, by a single developer, designer and artist for the Critical Gameplay exhibition. Each game was developed in a weekend (art, code, and design) and then tweaked over a week. As such the games are developed under a more independent development model.  The games return to the romantic notion of a lone-developer making a game late into the night.

The games listed are a subset of the Critical Gameplay collection which is an evolving collection of game notions.

The games are aesthetically designed to mimic characteristics of the game mechanics within their historical context (indicated by the date following). Each is designed to critique a specific gameplay mechanic from that year's standards.

 Charity (1978) 
 Black/White (1985)
 Simultaneity (1985) 
 EveryDay Heroes: Home (1990) 
 Levity (1994) 
 Healer (1996)
 You (1997)
 Bang! (1998)
 Match (2003)
 Wait (2005) 
 Big Huggin'  is an affection game (2011).
 Stolen Kisses (2013)

Exhibitions

2009

Their first exhibition of Critical Gameplay was done on April 17, 2009, on West Cermak Gallery, Chicago, Illinois, US.

Their second exhibition was on September 22, 2009, at Digital Expo on Miami University, Oxford, Ohio, US

The third exhibition  was done in October/November 2009 at the annual Symposium of the Special Commission of Games and Digital Entertainment of the Computing Brazilian Society (SBGames 2009) on Rio de Janeiro, Brazil.

The fourth exhibition was done in October 2009 on ACE2009 Creative Exhibition in Athens, Greece.

Their last exhibition in 2009 was on International Digital Media and Art Association's 7th Annual conference on Ball State University in Muncie, Indiana.

2010

 In April 2010 Critical Gameplay had an exhibit at Chi2010 (Conference on Human Factors in Computing Systems), at Atlanta, Georgia, US
 Their second exhibit was held at Meaningful Play 2010 on East Lansing Technology Innovation Center, East Lansing, Michigan, US
 Their last exhibition was held at International Digital Media and Art Association's 7th Annual conference on Vancouver British Columbia, Canada

2011

 In July 2011 Critical Gameplay had an exhibition at Games + Learning + Society Conference in Madison, Wisconsin

2012

 Their first exhibition on 2012 was done in June 2012 in Games, Learning, Society Conference on Madison, Wisconsin, Big Huggin' was available for play in juried art gallery.
 In July–August 2012 they had an exhibition on FILE Festival at Centro Cultural FIESP, São Paulo, Brazil.
 July 2012 on Artscape, Baltimore, Maryland, US
 October 2012 at Punk Arcade on Little Berlin Gallery, Philadelphia, Pennsylvania, US
 October 2012 at Meaningful Play on East Lansing Technology Innovation Center at Michigan State University, East Lansing, Michigan, US
 November 2012 on Computer Art Congress 3 (Post Digital Art) on Paris, France

2013

 June 2013 on Games for change festival at New World Stages, New York City, New York
 July 2013, 5th Annual Game Play Festival, Brooklyn, New York, US
 July 2013, Artscape, Baltimore, Maryland, US
 September 2013, Boston Festival of Independent Games, Massachusetts Instititue of Technology, Boston, Massachusetts, US
 November 2013, International Digital Media Arts Exhibit (IDEAS), Laguna Beach College of Art and Design, Laguna Beach, California US
 November 2013, 10th International Conference on Advances in Computer Entertainment Technology (ACE)
University of Twente, Bad Boekelo, Enschede, Netherlands

2014

 January 2014, on 12th Annual Magfest at National Harbor, Maryland, US, where Big Huggin' and Black Like Me available for play
 April 2014 at 9th International Conference on the Foundations of Digital Games on Fort Lauderdale, Florida, US and Cozumel, Mexico
 March–April 2014 at The Aesthetics of Gameplay, exhibited online
 July 2014, on 33rd Annual Artscape (Gamescape exhibits) in Baltimore, Maryland, US
 August 4, 2014, on Digital Games Research Association (DiGRA) Annual Conferencein Salt lake City, Utah, US
 September 2014, at Computer Art Congress in Nano Federal University, Rio de Janeiro, Brazil. Black Like Me available for play
 November 2014, at International Conference on Interactive Digital Storytelling Exhibition on ArtScience Museum at Marina Bay Sands, Singapore
 November 2014, at International Digital Media and Arts Association Exhibit (IDEAS), Utah Valley University, Salt Lake City, Orem, US
 November 2014, Advances in Computer Entertainment (ACE2014) in Funchal, Madeira, Portugal
Their last exhibition in December 2014 was on Indies from the Middle at Smithsonian American Art Museum on Washington DC, US, where they show their game Big Huggin', a demo was available for play

2015

 July 2015, 34th Annual Artscape (Gamescape exhibits) in Baltimore, Maryland, US

See also

 Lindsay Grace
 Big Huggin'

References 

Video game companies established in 2009
Companies based in Washington, D.C.
Video game companies of the United States
Video game publishers
Video game development companies
2009 establishments in Washington, D.C.